Senator Barceló may refer to:

Antonio Rafael Barceló (1868–1938), Senate of Puerto Rico 
Carlos Romero Barceló (1932–2021), Senate of Puerto Rico